Chrysocatharylla ceylonella is a moth in the family Crambidae. It was described by Stanisław Błeszyński in 1964. It is found in Sri Lanka.

References

Moths described in 1964